William, Willie, Bill, or Billy Thomas may refer to:

Actors and film professionals
 Bill Thomas (actor) (born 1952), English actor
 Bill Thomas (costume designer) (1921–2000), American costume designer
 William C. Thomas (1903–1984), American film producer
 William Thomas (actor), Welsh actor
 William Thomas Jr. (1947–2020), American actor
 William Thomas Jr. (child actor) or Billie "Buckwheat" Thomas (1931–1980), American actor

Businesspeople
 Bill Thomas (businessman) (born 1959), British business executive
 William Bevil Thomas (1757–1825), Newfoundland merchant and land developer
 William C. Thomas (1903–1984), American film producer
 Sir William James Thomas, 1st Baronet (1867–1945), Welsh industrialist and philanthropist
 William Winstead Thomas (1848–1904), American insurance company president and architect

Clergypeople
 Bill Thomas (priest) (born 1943), British Anglican archdeacon of Llandaff
 William Thomas (antiquary) (1670–1738), English Anglican priest and antiquary
 William Thomas (archdeacon of Northumberland) (born 1927), English Anglican priest
 William Thomas (bishop of Worcester) (1613–1689), Welsh Anglican bishop of Worcester
 William Thomas (chancellor of Llandaff Cathedral) (1734–1799), Welsh Anglican priest and scholar
 William Griffith Thomas (1861–1924), English Anglican priest and theologian
 William M. M. Thomas (1878–1951), American Episcopal bishop of the Missionary District of Brazil
 William Nathaniel Thomas (1892–1971), American Methodist minister and US Navy Chief of Chaplains
 William S. Thomas (1901–1986), American Episcopal suffragan bishop of the Diocese of Pittsburgh

Journalists
 Bill Thomas (author) (1934–2009), American author and photojournalist
 William Beach Thomas (1868–1957), British author and journalist
 William F. Thomas (1924–2014), American newspaper editor
 William Hannibal Thomas (1843–1935), American teacher, journalist, judge, writer and legislator
 William Moy Thomas (1828–1910), English journalist, literary editor and novelist

Military personnel
 William ap Thomas (died 1445), Welsh soldier and sheriff
 William Bain Thomas (1898–1967), British Army officer
 William Garfield Thomas Jr. (1916–1942), American naval officer
 William H. Thomas (Medal of Honor) (1923–1945), American soldier
 William Holland Thomas (1805–1893), American Confederate army officer 
 William Nathaniel Thomas (1892–1971), US Navy Chief of Chaplains
 William Waffle Thomas (1919–2014), American air force officer, former Air Force One pilot

Politicians

American politicians
 Bill Thomas (born 1941), US Representative from California
 Bill Thomas (Alaska politician) (born 1947), member of the Alaska House of Representatives
 Bill Thomas (Montana politician) (born 1935), Democratic Party member of the Montana House of Representatives
 Bill Thomas (writer) (born 1943), American writer
 William D. Thomas (1880–1936), American politician
 William H. Thomas (Waukesha Co.) (1821–1898), American politician
 William Hannibal Thomas (1843–1935), American teacher, journalist, judge, writer and legislator
 William Henry Thomas (1920–2009), American politician
 William L. Thomas (born 1967), American judge, nominated to a federal judgeship
 William Kernahan Thomas (1911–2001), American judge
 William M. Thomas, South Carolina legislator
 William Reuben Thomas (1866–1943), American civic leader
 William C. E. Thomas (1818–1876), American civic leader
 William W. Thomas Jr. (1839–1927), American diplomat and politician from Maine
 W. Aubrey Thomas (1866–1951), US Representative from Ohio

Australian politicians
 Bill Thomas (Australian politician) (born 1950), Western Australian politician
 William Thomas (Australian settler) (1793–1867), Australian colonist
 William Thomas (Victorian politician) (1869–1924), Victorian politician
 William Lemen Thomas (1872–1921), Western Australian politician

British politicians
 William Thomas (scholar) (died 1554), MP for Old Sarum and Downton
 Sir William Thomas, 1st Baronet (1641–1706), English politician
 Sir William Thomas, 2nd Baronet (died 1777), a Thomas baronet of Yapton
 Sir William Thomas, 4th Baronet (1777–1850), a Thomas baronet of Yapton
 Sir William Thomas, 5th Baronet (1807–1867), a Thomas baronet of Yapton
 William ap Thomas (died 1445), Welsh soldier and sheriff
 William Stanley Russell Thomas (1896–1957), British politician
 William Thomas (MP for Carnarvon) (died 1653), Welsh politician
 William Thomas (MP for Caernarvonshire) (died 1586), English politician
 William Thomas (MP for Ludgershall) (1630–1686), English lawyer and politician

Other politicians
 William Thomas (Newfoundland politician) (1785–1863), Newfoundland politician
 William Howell Arthur Thomas (1895–1979), member of the House of Commons of Canada

Scholars
 C. William Thomas, American accounting academic
 William Thomas (chancellor of Llandaff Cathedral) (1734–1799), Welsh priest and scholar
 William Thomas (MP for Old Sarum and Downton) (died 1554), MP for Old Sarum and Downton
 William Davies Thomas (1889–1954), Welsh literary scholar
 William G. Thomas III (born 1964), American historian
 William Griffith Thomas (1861–1924), English Anglican priest and theologian
 William Isaac Thomas (1863–1947), American sociologist

Sportspeople

Australian rules footballers
 Bill Thomas (Australian footballer) (1886–1974), Australian rules footballer
 Bill Thomas (footballer, born 1930), Australian footballer
 Billy Thomas (Australian footballer) (1902–1968), Australian rules footballer
 William "Digger" Thomas (1890–1953), Australian rules footballer

Gridiron football players and coaches
 Bill Thomas (American football) (born 1949), American football player
 Willie Thomas (Canadian football) (born 1955), Canadian football player
 William Thomas (linebacker) (born 1968), American football player
 William Thomas (offensive tackle) or Tra Thomas (born 1974), American football player
 William A. Thomas (1948–2019), American football coach

Rugby players
 Billy Thomas (rugby league) (1907–1972), Welsh rugby league footballer
 William Lewis Thomas (1913–1995), Welsh rugby union and rugby league footballer
 William Llewellyn Thomas (1872–1943), Welsh rugby union footballer
 Willie Thomas (rugby union) (1866–1921), Welsh rugby union footballer
 Willie Thomas (rugby league) (1881–1963), Welsh rugby league footballer

Other sportspeople
 Bill Thomas (baseball) (1877–1950), American baseball player
 Bill Thomas (ice hockey) (born 1983), American ice hockey player
 Bill Thomas (New Zealand footballer), New Zealand footballer
 Bill Thomas (sailor) (born 1925), Canadian sailor
 Bill Thomas (died 2009), American race car designer and performance tuner best known for the Bill Thomas Cheetah
 Billy Thomas (basketball) (born 1975), American basketball player
 Billy Thomas (footballer, born 1903) (1903–1992), Welsh footballer
 William Thomas (basketball) or Will Thomas (born 1986), American basketball player
 William Thomas (bowls) or Will Thomas (born 1954), Welsh lawn and indoor bowler
 William Thomas (cricketer) (born 1960), English cricketer
 William Thomas (footballer, born 1885) (1885–?), English soccer player
 William Thomas (karateka) (born 1965), English karateka

Others
 Billy Thomas (drummer) (born 1953), drummer with McBride & the Ride
 William Thomas (activist) (1947–2009), American anti-nuclear activist
 William Thomas (architect) (1799–1860), Anglo-Canadian architect
 William Thomas (Gwilym Marles) (1834–1879), Welsh poet
 William Thomas (Islwyn) (1832–1878), Welsh poet
 William Thomas (miller) (1838–1891), founded flourmill in South Australia
 "William Thomas", an alias of Wilhelm Meyer, who gained notoriety in the Adolph Beck case
 William Fitz Thomas, Irish judge
 William H. Thomas (physician) (born 1959), American physician
 William Jenkyn Thomas (1870–1959), Welsh headmaster and author
 William Kyffin Thomas (1821–1878), newspaper proprietor in South Australia
 William Luson Thomas (1830–1900), British wood-engraver and newspaper proprietor
 William Thelwall Thomas (1865–1927), Welsh surgeon
 William Tutin Thomas (1829–1892), Anglo-Canadian architect
 Willie Thomas (trumpeter) (1931–2019), American jazz trumpeter and educator
 Willie B. Thomas (1912–1977), American blues artist

See also
 Will Thomas (disambiguation)
 William Thomas Jr. (disambiguation)